565 may refer to:

565 A.D.
Interstate 565 - spur route of Interstate 65 in greater Huntsville, Alabama, United States
J. S. Bach's Toccata and Fugue in D minor, BWV 565, a piece of organ music

Toon-A-Vision